Moricone is a  (municipality) in the Metropolitan City of Rome in the Italian region of Latium, located about  northeast of Rome.

Moricone borders the following municipalities: Monteflavio, Montelibretti, Montorio Romano, Palombara Sabina.

Moricone is   known for its fresh produce and olive oil.

References

Cities and towns in Lazio